Mexican association football team Puebla F.C. has competed in the Primera División de México, Segunda División de México and Liga de Ascenso divisions. This article documents their statistics and club records.

Year by Year standings

First division

After the 1955–56 season, Puebla F.C. folded. It was reformed in the 1964-65 season, starting in the second division.

Second division

In 1970 the First Division was expanded from 16 to 18 teams; the Second Division champion Zacatepec was promoted and a playoff was held
for the remaining place. The teams competing for the place were Nacional, Naucalpan, Puebla and Union de Curtidores. Puebla won the playoff and was promoted.

First Division

This last total does not include the 92-93 season.

Short Tournaments

Primera A

First Division

Clubs Records
First goal in the first division (Cup)Guadalupe Velásquez 1944
First goal in the first division (League) Eladio Aschetto 1944
Largest win 8-1 against Tampico Madero 1986-87
Most goals scored Ricardo Alvarez 87 goles
Most goals score in long tournament  Jorge Orlando Aravena 1988-89 (28)
Most goals scored in short tournament Carlos Muñoz 1996 (15)
Fastes goal score in a game Nicolás Olivera 2009 (11 sec against Cruz Azul)
Most titles as manager Manuel Lapuente (5)League 82-83,89-90,Cup Mexico 89-90,cup champions in champions 89-90,League champions concacaf 1991
Most games won 1945–47 and 1988–89  won 20
Most game won in short tournament 1996 9
Most points obtain in a long tournament 1988-89 (69)
Most points obtain in a short tournament 1996 (31)
Most games played with the club  Arturo Alvarez (346) league games only

All time top goalscorers
Since the 1950s, when Ricardo Alvarez scored his 86th and last goal with the club, no one else has accomplished this feat. It was on May 21, 1959 when Alvarez scored his last goals with Puebla before leaving the club to join Veracruz. Alvarez left a record of 86 goals in 125 games through a career that spanned 5 years. Half a century later, the name of  "La Changa" Alvarez is still the best goal scorer ever in the history of Puebla F.C. in first division. Even with the club's constancy in first division, playing a total of 54 championships, no other player has reached Alvarez's number of goals scored and only one player has obtained the league goal scoring title in 1996.

It was the Spanish Carlos Muñoz who gave Puebla F.C. their only one goal scoring title in 1996 with 15 goals. Thanks to 4 good tournaments, Muñoz placed himself in the list of the best goal scorers in the club's history but still far from the 86 scored by Ricardo Alvarez.
Two players were close to beat Alvarez's record: Silvio Fogel in The 1970s and Carlos Poblete in the 1980s. Silvio Fogel scored 84 goals and now is the scoring runner-up in Puebla's history. Carlos Poblete scored 83 and now is third place in the all-time scoring list. Carlos Poblete is at the top of the list in goals scored in playoffs with 15 goals scored. Carlos and Silvio scored over 100 goals each one, but this was done playing with different clubs. And Ricardo Alvarez did the same scoring 113 goals in his career playing for Puebla F.C., Moctezuma, and Veracruz.

Goal scoring titles

Notable managers

Footnotes

Club Puebla
Mexican football club statistics